Izatha manubriata is a moth of the family Oecophoridae. It is endemic to New Zealand, where it is known from the southern South Island only.

Taxonomy 
This species was first described by Edward Meyrick in 1923. Meyrick used a specimen collected by George Hudson in forest at Ben Lomond, Lake Wakatipu in January. Hudson discussed and illustrated the species in his 1928 book The Butterflies and Moths of New Zealand. The holotype specimen is held at the Natural History Museum, London.

Description 
The wingspan is 24.5–27.5 mm for males and about 26 mm for females. The wing patternation of this species makes it easy to distinguish from other species in the genus Izatha that are present in the South Island.

Meyrick originally described the species as follows:

Distribution 
This species is endemic to New Zealand. It is likely endemic to the Otago Lakes district and adjacent ranges of Central Otago. Along with the type locality of Ben Lomond, the species has also been collected at Mount Aurum, Bold Peak, Queenstown, Moke Lake, Lake Wakatipu, the Garvie Mountains and Pomahaka Valley. Hudson regarded it as a rare species.

Biology and behaviour
Adults are on wing from December to early March. The larvae and biology of this species is unknown as it has never been reared. Only one female specimen has been collected.

Habitat and host species 
Hudson stated that this species could be found near the edges of beech forest on the mountains.

References

External links

Image of the holotype specimen of the species

Further reading

Oecophorinae
Taxa named by Edward Meyrick
Endemic fauna of New Zealand
Moths of New Zealand
Endemic moths of New Zealand